Robin Bell (born 16 November 1977 in Cape Town) is a South African-born, Australian slalom canoeist who competed from the late 1990s to the late 2000s. Competing in three Summer Olympics, he won a bronze medal in the C1 event in Beijing in 2008.

Bell also won a complete set of medals in the C1 event at the ICF Canoe Slalom World Championships with a gold in 2005, a silver in 1999 and a bronze in 2007.

He won the overall World Cup title in C1 in 2005 and 2008.

He was named Western Australian Sports Star of the Year in 2005, and became world number one in 2006.

World Cup individual podiums

1 World Championship counting for World Cup points
2 Oceania Championship counting for World Cup points
3 Pan American Championship counting for World Cup points

References

Australian Olympic Committee profile

Yahoo! Sports

1977 births
Australian Institute of Sport canoeists
Australian male canoeists
Canoeists at the 2000 Summer Olympics
Canoeists at the 2004 Summer Olympics
Canoeists at the 2008 Summer Olympics
Living people
Olympic canoeists of Australia
Olympic bronze medalists for Australia
Sportspeople from Cape Town
South African emigrants to Australia
Olympic medalists in canoeing
Medalists at the 2008 Summer Olympics
Medalists at the ICF Canoe Slalom World Championships